Yaarukku Theriyum is a 2012 Indian film directed by Kamaraj. The film stars Nishan, Sanjana Singh, Achyuth Kumar, Harish Raj, Sanjana Singh, Kalabhavan Mani, Jayaprakash, Riyaz Khan and Dharma. This film was simultaneously shot in Kannada, Tamil, and Malayalam, with the Kannada and Malayalam versions titled Challenge and 120 Minutes, respectively. The film is an adaptation of Unknown (2006).

Plot 
A group of youngsters get locked up in a factory. The next day, none of them remember anything.

Cast 

 Nishan as Shakthi
 Achyuth Kumar as Soori
 Harish Raj as Baasha
 Sanjana Singh as Mala, Baasha's wife
 Dileep Raj as Kishore
 Kalabhavan Mani as Balaji
 Jayaprakash as Vishwanath, Malar/Kamala's father
 Riyaz Khan as Glothu
 Dharma as Narayan
 Kovai Senthil (Tamil) / Biradar (Kannada) as a coconut seller 
 Sadiq (Malayalam)
 Krishnamoorthy as a drunkard (Kannada)

Production 
Sanjana Singh, who starred in Renigunta (2009) was signed to play the love interest of Harish Raj. Kannada actor Harish Raj dubbed for himself in the Tamil version. The Malayalam version featured different characterisations than the other two versions.

Soundtrack 
The soundtrack consists of two songs composed by Kannan.

Kannada version
Lyrics by Chi Dattaraj and V. Nagendra Prasad.
Challenge Beku
Enne Kudi

Tamil version
Yaaruku Theriyum - lyrics by Yugabharathi and sung by Haricharan
Nandu Chicken – lyrics by Vaali and sung by Mukesh

Malayalam version 
Lyrics by Aziz.

Reception 
The Kannada and Tamil versions released to polarized reviews.
 Kannada version
Sify stated that "The film takes a slow start but picks up later with the narrative becoming interesting and it continues to engage you till the climax". Nowrunning wrote that "Despite lack of commercially pleasing elements, "Challenge is appealing. Watch it". The Times of India opined that "While Dharma shines as a police officer, Harish Raj, Dilip Raj and Achuth Kumar have done justice to their roles. Sanjana Singh has little to do. Cinematography by Mahesh K Dev is impressive".

Conversely, The New Indian Express stated that "But, director Kamaraj who had an intelligent subject at hand has lost points in his presentation and could not transcend it whole-heartedly on to the screen".

 Tamil version
The Times of India gave the film three out of five stars wrote that "Yaarukku Theriyum is a rare movie that has brought together smaller names from the south Indian film industry". The Times of India also praised the performances of Achyutha Kumar and Harish Raj saying that "Kannada actors Achyuth Kumar and Harish Raj, as  Baasha, come out on top with their performances".

On the contrary, News18 opined that "Despite an engaging plot, the film struggles to keep you hooked and eventually graduates as one sans any thrills". News 18 also criticized the use of English dialogue in the film. The New Indian Express criticized the film and wrote that "But the characters are too many, and the numerous sub-plots linking them at times seem contrived". Behindwoods wrote that "Director Ganesan Kamaraj seems to have focused his intentions on getting the audience to play the guessing game but disappointment looms as the surprises turn out to be far from clever". DNA India opined that "Yaarukku Theriyum engages partly, but disappoints extremely".

References 

2012 films
2010s Malayalam-language films
2010s Tamil-language films
2010s Kannada-language films
Indian multilingual films
2012 multilingual films
Indian remakes of American films